Hanging Wood (or Highfields Wood) is an area of woodland situated between the old Great North Road and the Roman Road, and between the mining villages of Highfields and Woodlands in South Yorkshire, England.  The Woodlands wildlife park and an ornamental lake, Highfields Lake are features of the wood, as is Woodlands, a former country house, now a social club.

Hanging Wood was part of Barnsdale Forest, where the original Robin Hood ballads are set.  A "Robin Hood's stream" rises near the Roman Road at Highfields approximately 200 yards east of the Cinder path between Highfields and Woodlands and flows into the river Pick or (Pick burn) which itself flows into Highfields Lake.

Hanging Wood was reputedly one of the favourite 'hold up' spots for the 17th Century Highwayman William Nevison (Swift Nick, Black Bob). The London to York Stage coach had to negotiate a small valley at the point where the Roman Ridge crossed over the Pick Burn in Hangingwood due to having to reduce speed to negotiate this natural obstacle the Stage coaches had to reduce speed to walking pace which made them vulnerable to ambush in what is still an isolated location.

There is a record of one such attack in the Archives at Doncaster Council where a 'Hue and Cry' (Posse) was raised and said highwayman chased to Owston Village via Skellow before he evaded his pursuers.

The Ghost of a Headless Horseman allegedly haunts the Roman Ridge at Hanging wood.

Forests and woodlands of South Yorkshire
Adwick le Street